The 2021 Coppa Italia Final decided the winners of the 2020–21 Coppa Italia, the 74th season of Italy's main football cup. It was played on 19 May 2021 for the first time at the Mapei Stadium – Città del Tricolore, Reggio Emilia, between Atalanta and Juventus. Juventus won the match 2–1 for a record fourteenth title.

As winners, Juventus would have automatically qualified to the group stage of the 2021–22 UEFA Europa League, although they had already qualified for European competition through their league position. They also earned the right to contest the 2021 Supercoppa Italiana against the champions of the 2020–21 Serie A, Internazionale.

Background
Atalanta made its fifth appearance in the final, and second in three years. They recorded one win and three defeats in their previous four appearances, having lost three in a row after winning their only title in 1963. It was a record twentieth appearance for Juventus in a Coppa Italia final, and sixth appearance in the last seven years. Going into the final, Juventus had thirteen wins and six losses. The two teams had never met in a Coppa Italia final.

Road to the final
Note: In all results below, the score of the finalist is given first (H: home; A: away).

Match

Details

See also
 2020–21 Coppa Italia
 2021–22 UEFA Europa League
 2021 Supercoppa Italiana
List of Coppa Italia finals

Notes

References 

Coppa Italia Finals
Coppa Italia Final 2021
Coppa Italia Final 2021
Coppa Italia Final
Coppa Italia Final